The seventh series of the British medical drama television series Casualty commenced airing in the United Kingdom on BBC One on 12 September 1992 and finished on 27 February 1993.

Cast

Overview
The seventh series of Casualty features a cast of characters working in the emergency department of Holby City Hospital. The series began with 8 roles with star billing. Nigel Le Vaillant stars as emergency medicine consultant Julian Chapman. Derek Thompson continues his role as charge nurse Charlie Fairhead, while Cathy Shipton plays sister Lisa "Duffy" Duffin. Patrick Robinson and Maureen Beattie appear as staff nurses Martin "Ash" Ashford and Sandra Nicholl. Ian Bleasdale and Caroline Webster portray paramedics Josh Griffiths and Jane Scott. Anne Kristen continues to portray receptionist Norma Sullivan. Additional cast who appear in a recurring capacity included Imogen Boorman, Nicola Jefferies and Ken Sharrock who portray Ash's girlfriend Nikki Wyatt, receptionist Jenny and Maxine's dad Kevin Price respectively.

Joanna Foster, Jason Riddington and Emma Bird were introduced in episode one as staff general manager Kate Miller, senior house officer Rob Khalefa and healthcare assistant Maxine Price. Robert Daws joined the cast in episode six as administrator Simon Eastman while Clive Mantle began appearing as emergency medicine consultant Mike Barratt in episode nineteen. Registrar Andrew Bower (William Gaminara) was reintroduced in episode sixteen, having previously appeared in series 4. Foster departed the series in episode eight, while Riddington, Bird, Daws and Gaminara left at the conclusion of the series. Le Vaillant and Beattie chose to leave the show, with Le Vaillant departing in episode fourteen and Beattie departing in episode twenty-four.

Main characters 

Maureen Beattie as Sandra Nicholl (until episode 24)
Emma Bird as Maxine Price (episodes 1−24)
Ian Bleasdale as Josh Griffiths
Robert Daws as Simon Eastman (episodes 6−24)
Joanna Foster as Kate Miller (episodes 1−8)
William Gaminara as Andrew Bower (episodes 16−24)
Anne Kristen as Norma Sullivan
Nigel Le Vaillant as Julian Chapman (until episode 14)
Clive Mantle as Mike Barratt (from episode 19)
Jason Riddington as Rob Khalefa (episodes 1−24)
Patrick Robinson as Martin "Ash" Ashford
Cathy Shipton as Lisa "Duffy" Duffin
Derek Thompson as Charlie Fairhead
Caroline Webster as Jane Scott

Recurring and guest characters 
Imogen Boorman as Nikki Wyatt (episodes 3−18)
Nicola Jefferies as Jenny (episodes 2−13)
Ken Sharrock as Kevin Price (episodes 20−22)

Episodes

References

External links
 Casualty series 7 at the Internet Movie Database

07
1992 British television seasons
1993 British television seasons